Liu Jia (Chinese: 刘佳; born 16 February 1982 in Beijing, China) is a Chinese-born Austrian left-handed table tennis player.

Early life
From 1992 to 1995, Liu attended Shichahai Sporting High School in Beijing. Afterward she became a member of professional club Shian Nuntan, where she played with Zhang Yining. Despite Liu's successes as a Cadet and Junior, competition within the Chinese team was strong and prospects for a future international career were dim. Instead of following a call to Japan, Liu travelled to Austria when the opportunity arose to play for Austrian team Linz AG Froschberg.

She arrived in March 1997 without speaking either German or English, but quickly learned German within the year that she settled in Austria. She won the first International Austrian Youth Championships soon after her arrival. On 16 February 1998, her 16th birthday, she became an Austrian citizen and a member of the Austrian table tennis squad. Husband David Arvidsson is an international Danish table tennis player.

Career
Liu continued her success on youth level by taking Gold in the Singles, Doubles and Mixed competition at the 1998 European Youth Championships in Norcia. In 1999, she again claimed the singles and mixed titles in Frydek-Mistek.

She competed at the 2000 Sydney Olympics, the 2004 Olympics in Athens and the 2008 Beijing Olympics, reaching the third round of the singles competition in each of them. She also competed in the team competition in Beijing. In May 2011, she qualified for her fourth Olympic attendance in the 2012 London Olympics where she was knocked out in the third round.

She competed at the 2016 Summer Olympics in Rio de Janeiro. She was defeated in the fourth round by Feng Tianwei of Singapore. She also competed in the women's team event, but the Austrian team was defeated by Japan in the quarterfinals. Liu was the flag bearer for Austria during the Parade of Nations.

In the 2020 Summer Olympics, Liu defeated 12-year-old Syrian Hend Zaza in the preliminary round of the Women's Singles, with a score of  11:4, 11:9, 11:3, 11:5. Zaza was the youngest competitor in the games, the youngest table tennis player to compete in any Olympics, and the first Syrian table tennis player to qualify for the Olympics. In the first round Liu defeated Ukrainian Hanna Haponova.

Results

European Championships
European Champion Women's Singles: 2005 Aarhus
Silver medal Women's Singles: 2008 St Petersburg
Silver medal Women's Singles: 2010 Ostrava
Bronze medal Mixed: 2005 Aarhus (with Werner Schlager)
Bronze medal Mixed: 2002 Zagreb (with Werner Schlager)

World Championships
Quarterfinals Women's Singles and Doubles: 2001 Osaka
6th place Women's Team: 2008 Guangzhou

Pro Tour
Winner 2012 Czech Open: Women's Singles
Winner 2008 German Open: Women's Singles
Winner 2004 Brazil Open: Women's Singles
Winner 2004 US Open: Women's Doubles
Runner-up 2006 Polish Open: Women's Singles and Doubles
Runner-up 2004 Egypt Open: Women's Singles
Runner-up 2004 Croatia Open: Women's Singles
Runner-up 2003 Korea Open: Women's Singles
Runner-up 2001 Brazil Open: Women's Singles
Runner-up 2001 Croatia Open: Women's Doubles
Runner-up 1999 Czech Open: Women's Doubles
Runner-up 1999 Australian Open: Women's Doubles
Runner-up 1999 Qatar Open: Women's Doubles

References

External links

1982 births
Living people
Austrian female table tennis players
Table tennis players at the 2000 Summer Olympics
Table tennis players at the 2004 Summer Olympics
Table tennis players at the 2008 Summer Olympics
Table tennis players at the 2012 Summer Olympics
Table tennis players at the 2016 Summer Olympics
Olympic table tennis players of Austria
Chinese emigrants to Austria
Table tennis players from Beijing
Table tennis players at the 2015 European Games
European Games competitors for Austria
Naturalised table tennis players
Naturalised citizens of Austria
Table tennis players at the 2019 European Games
Austrian sportspeople of Chinese descent
Table tennis players at the 2020 Summer Olympics